Love and Suicide is a 2006 independent lesbian romance film by Mia Salsi.

Plot 

Kaye Canon (Stella Johnson) has just moved from Atlanta to New Orleans and enrolled in a new school. On her first day she becomes friends with Brandy (Tai Cambre) the head cheerleader and student council president. Brandy introduces Kaye to her friends Sarah (Jessie Terrebonne), Leslie (Lida Sunsin), and Emily Segreto (Sarah Reardon). After the bell rings Emily shows Kaye to her Social Studies class which is next to Emily's Spanish class and the two quickly become friends. After school Emily gets a lift home from David (Peter Boggia) who has an unrequited crush on Emily. They offer to drive Kaye home and get high on the way. When they arrive at Kaye's house her mother Susan (Judy Henderson) warns Kaye to choose better friends.

After dropping off Kaye, David takes Emily home. Outside her house David confesses that he is in love with Emily but he is rejected. Emily decides they need to have some time apart and tells him she does not want to lose their friendship. Later that night Emily calls Kaye to talk but during their call David returns to her house to talk. David gives Emily a stolen Plastic Rose as an apology for his actions earlier and offers to let her borrow his car whilst he is away for the weekend at Lake Charles. Emily then asks Kaye if she wants to skip school and go to Jodie's boat party instead. On the way to the party they pick up Chuck (Cole Blackburn) who knows where the Marina is but not which boat it is on. They arrive at the Marina but are unable to find which boat the party is on. Having already skipped school they decide to just have fun anyway and show Kaye around New Orleans like a tourist. Later that night Emily and Kaye are sitting outside on the grass talking and Emily asks Kaye why she has just moved to New Orleans. Kaye tells her that her dad had been murdered and they moved here to be closer to her mother's family. Kaye blames herself for his death because she had always wished he was dead. Emily attempts to cheer her up and Kaye cries on Emily's shoulder.

When Kaye returns home her mother is angry that she is late. She tells her that she was studying at the library with Emily. Susan asks whether Emily is a good Christian girl and asks which church she attends. As they continue to argue Susan accuses Emily of being lesbian and says that homosexuality is a sin. Kaye becomes upset at her mother's accusations and unwillingness to be nice to Emily who she now considers to be her best friend. Kaye and Emily attempt to spend some time together however they are constantly interrupted by Kaye's little brother Rick (Ryan Miley) who is never without a helmet on because of his fear of the sky falling after hearing the story of chicken little when he was younger. Kaye decides she has had enough of her mother and brother's constant interference and plans to leave and visit her aunts in Atlanta however Emily suggests they visit her brother in Lake Charles with David instead which is only a few hours away.

Upon arriving at Lake Charles, Kaye meets Emily's brother Peter (Greg Williamson) and his wife Dana (Jen Christensen) who have fun showing Kaye some of Emily's baby photos. Emily receives a phone call from her mother telling her that Susan is looking for Kaye and telling them to come home. Emily and Kaye are unable to leave without David who had driven them to Lake Charles and still has to work for the weekend so they spend the weekend with Peter and Dana. At the end of the weekend David drives Kaye home and then Emily. Outside Emily's house David tries to kiss Emily but is once again rejected and then Emily starts crying and tells David she is in love with Kaye. When Emily enters her house her mother is angry and blames Kaye for being a bad influence on her, an argument ensues and Emily runs out of the house and goes to meet Kaye. As Emily and Kaye talk, Kaye comments that she thinks Emily is her soul mate but becomes uncomfortable when Emily starts to touch her and Emily leaves. Emily walks around for a while before looking up at the sky and shouting "Kaye, I love you" at the same time David in another location is also looking up at the sky shouting "Emily, I love you".

At school Kaye and Emily meet Brandy, Sarah and Leslie and hear that rumors have been spreading that Kaye and Emily had been kicked out of their homes and eloped together. Emily makes a joke about how they are in love and Kaye is pregnant with Emily's baby, they plan to raise it to be king of the world but can't because Kaye is now grounded. As Emily drives Kaye home after school she makes another love joke but then Kaye begins to cry. Kaye confesses that she loves Emily more than she should. Emily hugs Kaye and tells her she loves her as well and they begin to kiss in the car. Once at Kaye's house they enter her bedroom and make love

That night at 2:30AM David goes to Kaye's house looking for Emily and asks to talk to her privately in the car. He once again confesses his love to her and is rejected again. David refuses to accept that she is a lesbian and this time he becomes violent and Kaye, Susan and Rick have to come help Emily and threaten to call the police. The next day Emily fights with her mother again this time resulting in her mother hitting her. Emily goes to meet Kaye and when Susan sees her wounds she gives her ice for the swelling and offers to let her move in with them. Susan believes Emily is a troubled girl but that Jesus can save her and they all read the Bible together. On Kaye's 17th birthday Emily decorates Kaye's bedroom with many flowers and balloons and gives her a card containing poetry she had written for her. Several days later Brandy, Sarah and Leslie discuss going to a party and comment on how Kaye and Emily never do anything alone anymore and call them Dykes behind their back. Brandy goes through Kaye's school bag and takes the poem she had received from Emily on her birthday.

Christmas approaches and Kaye and Emily are upset that they will be apart on Christmas Day. Emily has to visit her brother in Lake Charles and Kaye has to visit her aunts in Atlanta although they promise to call on Christmas Day. Christmas Day arrives and Emily calls several times, but unfortunate timing results in no one home every time she calls. After Christmas Kaye and Emily are back in New Orleans together and Kaye is worried Emily forgot about her. Emily promises she will never leave her and gives her a ring which she places on her Ring Finger. Returning to school Leslie reveals she has a crush on Chuck, and Brandy asks Kaye and Emily if they think Chuck is hot. When Brandy notices the ring on Kaye's finger she asks if she got married and Kaye lies telling her it is from her Boyfriend Mark. Brandy is unconvinced telling her she knows it is from Emily and then begins to read out loud the poem Emily had written to Kaye.

Kaye runs away and Emily asks Chuck to drive them home. Friction develops in Emily and Kaye's relationship over the fact that Kaye always hides her love for Emily from others and even lied about who the ring was from. After the whole school finds out about Emily and Kaye's relationship Kaye becomes the target of bullying in school and starts to go to Church regularly. After Emily finishes school she gets a job and moves into her own apartment. Susan commends Emily for her maturity and responsibility but then denies Kaye to move in with Emily. On Emily's 18th birthday Kaye reveals she has gotten a job at a Deli, this restricts the amount of time Emily and Kaye can see each other. Their time spent together dwindles until weeks goes by without seeing each other. Kaye still unwilling to tell her mother that she is a lesbian removes the ring from her finger and more time passes. Emily goes to deli to see Kaye and ask why they never see each other anymore. Emily becomes suspicious of Kaye's behavior with Andrew (Michael Villafranco) who also works at the deli. When Emily asks if she is dating Andrew she will not answer and Emily's notices the ring is not on her finger anymore and tells Kaye she never wants to see her again. Later Emily regrets what she said and goes to Kaye's house to apologize. Emily decides to wait in Kaye's room until she gets back but finds a letter written by Kaye confirming that she is dating Andrew and leaves upset. Kaye finds out the Emily knows she is dating Andrew and goes to talk to Emily however when she arrives she finds Emily lying unconscious with empty pill bottles and calls for an ambulance. Emily survives but must explain her actions and prove to a doctor she won't do it again before they will let her leave. Initially reluctant to talk Emily eventually tells the doctor about her relationship with Kaye and how she feels betrayed by what happened.

After being discharged Kaye drives Emily home from the hospital. Emily becomes angry when Kaye mentions that Susan is praying for Emily. Emily blames Susan for breaking up their relationship and making Kaye date Andrew. Kaye says that homosexuality is a sin but they can still be friends, however Emily doesn't want friendship and leaves. A few days later Kaye receives a box containing all the things Emily had from her. Kaye breaks down into tears and is comforted by her brother Rick who even gives her his helmet. 10 years pass and it is shown that Kaye has married, she takes off her wedding ring and replaces it with the ring Emily had given her. She then commits suicide in a similar manner to which Emily had tried earlier. The films ends with Emily receiving the news that Kaye had died from her mother.

Cast 

 Sarah Reardon as Emily Segreto
 Stella Johnson as Kaye Canon
 Peter Boggia as David
 Judy Henderson as Susan
 Silvia Mariani as Emily's Mom
 Ryan Miley as Rick
 Tai Cambre as Brandy
 Jessie Terrebonne as Sarah
 Karl Lengel as Doctor
 Ryan Kondyra as David's Friend
 Cole Blackburn as Chuck
 Jen Christensen as Dana
 Greg Williamson as Peter
 Lida Sunsin as Leslie
 Michael Villafranco as Andrew

 Patricia Charles as Principal
 Bradley Plaisance as Kaye's Husband
 Angele Crawford as Kaye's Cousin
 John Crawford as Kaye's Cousin
 Tom Epps as Kaye's Uncle
 Fred Meade as Churchgoer 1
 Mimi Loftus as Churchgoer 2
 Nancy Lococo as Churchgoer 3
 Christina Allen as Student 1
 Kris Kennedy as Student 2
 Chillah Moezi as Student 3
 Elette Peterson as Student 4
 Jenna Robichaux as Student 5
 Ashley Sunsin as Student 6

External links 
 official website
 

2006 films
Lesbian-related films
American drama films
2006 drama films
Films about suicide
2000s English-language films
2000s American films